Konstantinos Kosmopoulos (1928 – February 12, 2011) was a Greek politician who served as the Mayor of Thessaloniki, Greece's second largest city, from 1989 to 1998. He was succeeded in office by Vasilis Papageorgopoulos.

Kosmopoulos died on February 12 2011, of a cardiac arrest at the age of 83.

References

1928 births
2011 deaths
Mayors of Thessaloniki